Garrett Raboin is the head coach of Augustana University men's ice hockey team in Sioux Falls, South Dakota. He is a retired American professional ice hockey player who most recently played in the Norwegian GET-ligaen for Lørenskog IK in Lørenskog, an eastern suburb of Oslo.  Prior to joining the Lørenskog team in the fall of 2011, he played in Turku, Finland for TPS of the SM-liiga.

Raboin played collegiate hockey at St. Cloud State University in Minnesota and later was an assistant coach with the team. Raboin was team Assistant Captain his sophomore year and Captain during his junior and senior year.  Prior to attending St. Cloud State, he played for the Lincoln Stars of the United States Hockey League.

Playing career

Lincoln Stars
In 2003, Garrett Raboin began his career playing for the Lincoln Stars. He helped the stars by scoring 12 goals, and by having 43 assists in his 3 seasons with the Stars.

He helped the Stars make it to the USHL Post Season in the 2004-05 Season along with the 2005-06 season.

St. Cloud State Huskies
In 2006, Garrett Raboin started to attend St. Cloud State University in St. Cloud, Minnesota. While there he played college hockey and scored 21 times, assisted 46 times.

He was an alternate captain in the 2007-08 season and Captain in the 2008–09 and 2009-10 seasons.

TPS
After graduating from St. Cloud State, Raboin went to play hockey for TPS in the Liiga League. While there he scored 6 goals and had 6 assists.

Lørenskog IK
In 2011, he went to Lørenskog where he had 14 goals and 6 assists and helped them make the playoffs.

Coaching career

St. Cloud State Huskies
During the 2012-13 season, he became an assistant coach at St. Cloud State under then head coach Bob Motzko. He helped the team make it to the NCAA Hockey Tournament in 2012-13, 2013–14, 2014–15, 2015–16, 2017-18 seasons. He also helped the team get 1st place in the NCHC Hockey tournament in the 2015-2016 season along with a 1st place WCHA conference finish in the 2012-13 season. He also helped them win the NCHC regular season in 2013-14, and 2017-18 seasons.

Awards and honors

References

External links

1985 births
American men's ice hockey defensemen
 Augustana (South Dakota) Vikings men's ice hockey
Ice hockey players from Minnesota
Living people
Lørenskog IK players
Lincoln Stars players
St. Cloud State Huskies men's ice hockey players